Saravan Rural District is a rural district (dehestan) in Sangar District, Rasht County, Gilan Province, Iran. At the 2006 census, its population was 13,986, in 3,783 families. The rural district has 7 villages.

References 

Rural Districts of Gilan Province
Rasht County